The 2004 Conference USA men's basketball tournament was held March 10–13 at the U.S. Bank Arena in Cincinnati, Ohio.

Hosts Cincinnati defeated top-seeded DePaul in the championship game, 55–50, to clinch their fourth Conference USA men's tournament championship.

The Bearcats, in turn, received an automatic bid to the 2004 NCAA tournament. They were joined in the tournament by fellow C-USA members UAB, Charlotte, DePaul, and Memphis, all of whom earned at-large bids.

Format
There were no changes to the tournament format from the previous year. 

The top four teams were given byes into the quarterfinal round while the next eight teams were placed into the first round. The two teams with the worst conference records were not invited to the tournament. All remaining tournament seeds were determined by regular season conference records.

Bracket

References

Conference USA men's basketball tournament
Tournament
Conference USA men's basketball tournament
Conference USA men's basketball tournament